Monachiti is a village and a community of the Grevena municipality. Before the 2011 local government reform it was a part of the municipality of Theodoros Ziakas, of which it was a municipal district. The 2011 census recorded 98 residents in the village. The community of Monachiti covers an area of 41.681 km2.

See also
 List of settlements in the Grevena regional unit

References

Populated places in Grevena (regional unit)